The Volcán Wolf giant tortoise (Chelonoidis niger becki), also known commonly as the Wolf Volcano giant tortoise and the Cape Berkeley giant tortoise, is a subspecies of Galápagos tortoise in the family Testudinidae. The subspecies is native to the north side of Ecuador's Isabela Island (formerly Albemarle Island). Chelonoidis becki has links to two different lineages including that of Chelonoidis darwini from the nearby island of Santiago. C. becki has been found to be the product of a double colonization event beginning around 199,000 years ago, and had been formed through introgression, where greater male selectivity was exhibited by purebred females in one of the lineages. It is most commonly found on the northern, western, and southwestern slopes of Volcán Wolf, the volcano that it is named for. Having evolved to live in a specific environment, C. becki only occupies an estimated range of about 263 square kilometers. An estimated 1,150 Volcán Wolf giant tortoises inhabit Volcán Wolf.

Etymology
The specific name, becki, is in honor of American ornithologist Rollo Howard Beck.

Habitat
The preferred natural habitats of C. becki are forest and shrubland.

Diet
C. becki has a vegetarian diet.

References

Further reading
Rothschild W (1901). "On a New Land-Tortoise from the Galapagos Islands". Novitates Zoologicae 8: 372. (Testudo becki, new subspecies).

Chelonoidis
Subspecies
Taxa named by Walter Rothschild
Endemic reptiles of the Galápagos Islands
Reptiles described in 1901